The Desert Shield and Desert Storm Memorial is under planning to be constructed in Washington, D.C. near the Lincoln Memorial. It will honor members of the armed forces who participated in Operation Desert Storm or Operation Desert Shield. 

The National Desert Storm and Desert Shield War Memorial Act authorized the National Desert Storm Memorial Association to establish a memorial in the capital without use of federal funds. The bill was incorporated into Howard P. "Buck" McKeon National Defense Authorization Act for Fiscal Year 2015 and was enacted in December 2014.

Background

The Gulf War (2 August 1990 – 28 February 1991), codenamed Operation Desert Storm (17 January 1991 – 28 February 1991) was a war waged by coalition forces from 34 nations led by the United States against Iraq in response to Iraq's invasion and annexation of Kuwait.

The war is also known under other names, such as the Persian Gulf War, First Gulf War, Gulf War I, Kuwait War, or the First Iraq War, after the term "Iraq War" became identified instead with the 2003 Iraq War (also referred to in the U.S. as "Operation Iraqi Freedom").
Kuwait's invasion by Iraqi troops that began 2 August 1990 was met with international condemnation, and brought immediate economic sanctions against Iraq by members of the U.N. Security Council. U.S. President George H. W. Bush deployed U.S. forces into Saudi Arabia, and urged other countries to send their own forces to the scene. An array of nations joined the Coalition, the biggest coalition since World War II. The great majority of the Coalition's military forces were from the U.S., with Saudi Arabia, the United Kingdom and Egypt as leading contributors, in that order. Saudi Arabia paid around US$36 billion of the US$60 billion cost.

Operation Desert Shield was the codename for a "wholly defensive" United States mission to prevent Iraq from invading Saudi Arabia. Operation Desert Shield began on 7 August 1990 when U.S. troops were sent to Saudi Arabia due also to the request of its monarch, King Fahd, who had earlier called for U.S. military assistance. This "wholly defensive" doctrine was quickly abandoned when, on 8 August, Iraq declared Kuwait to be Iraq's 19th province and Saddam named his cousin, Ali Hassan Al-Majid, as its military-governor.

Approximately 500,000 Americans served in operations Desert Storm and Desert Shield. There were 382 American fatalities.

Provisions of the bill
This summary is based largely on the summary provided by the Congressional Research Service, a public domain source.

The National Desert Storm and Desert Shield War Memorial Act would authorize the National Desert Storm Memorial Association to establish a commemorative work on federal land in the District of Columbia to commemorate and honor those who, as members of the Armed Forces, served on active duty in support of Operation Desert Storm or Operation Desert Shield.

The bill would prohibit the use of federal funds to pay any expense to establish the commemorative work.

The bill would require the Association, upon payment of all expenses for the memorial's establishment (including perpetual maintenance and preservation expenses), to transmit any remaining balance to the United States Secretary of the Interior for deposit in the separate account with the National Park Foundation (NPF) established for crediting money provided by a sponsor of a commemorative work.

The bill would require any remaining balance transmitted to the separate NPF account upon expiration of the authority to establish the commemorative work to be available to the Secretary or to the Administrator of the General Services Administration (GSA), as appropriate, following a specified process.

Procedural history
The National Desert Storm and Desert Shield War Memorial Act was introduced into the United States House of Representatives on February 5, 2014 by Rep. David P. Roe (R, TN-1). The bill was referred to the United States House Committee on Natural Resources and the United States House Natural Resources Subcommittee on Public Lands and Environmental Regulation. The bill was reported (amended) by the committee on May 6, 2014 alongside House Report 113-437. 

Rep. Roe, who introduced the bill, said "I believe we should honor the commitment of every man and woman that honorably serves this country, and I am proud to see this bill move forward."

AMVETS supported the bill, with their National Executive Director Stewart Hickey saying that they were pleased that "Gulf War veterans can finally be recognized for their valiant service to our nation." The American Legion, the National Guard Association of the United States, and the Air Force Association also supported the bill.

On May 28, 2014, the House voted in Roll Call Vote 242 to pass the bill 370-0. It was subsequently passed into law as part of the 2015 National Defense Authorization Act, which removed "War" from the title.

Monument planning 
A subsequent bill enacted in March 2017 authorized the construction in the restricted Area 1 near the National Mall, which will expire in March 2024. The Commission of Fine Arts approved a location north of the Lincoln Memorial in 2018 and approved a conceptual design in November 2019. 

Lead designer OLIN had anticipated completion in 2021. The design has curved walls surrounding a central water feature.

The National Desert Storm Memorial Association, however, must raise another $22 million (as of November 2019) of its $40 million goal before it can begin construction.

Groundbreaking

A groundbreaking ceremony for the memorial occurred at the site of its future location on July 14, 2022.

See also

List of bills in the 113th United States Congress
List of national memorials of the United States

References

External links

Library of Congress - Thomas H.R. 503
beta.congress.gov H.R. 503
GovTrack.us H.R. 503
OpenCongress.org H.R. 503
WashingtonWatch.com H.R. 503
Congressional Budget Office's report on H.R. 503
House Report 113-437 on H.R. 503

Proposed legislation of the 113th United States Congress
Gulf War
Proposed monuments and memorials in the United States